Vespa ducalis, the black-tailed hornet, is a hornet and an insect in the genus Vespa. It was described by Smith in 1852. In Japan, it is called

Description 
The workers have a body length of 24–32 mm; the queen is about 37 mm. They have a distinctive black tail. They are only slightly smaller than the Asian giant hornet (Vespa mandarinia) which has a body length of about 30–55 mm.

Distribution 
It is found in Asia in places such as China (mainland), Hong Kong, India (northeast part), Japan, the Korean Peninsula, Myanmar, Nepal, Siberia in Russia, Taiwan, Thailand and Vietnam (north and central part).

Behaviour 
The larvae of Vespa ducalis basically only eat the pupae and larvae of paper wasps and so adult Vespa ducalis will often attack the nests of paper wasps and hunt the larvae, while ignoring the adults. They will habitually return to the same target colony to raid it.

Nest 
The colonies it creates are the smallest of those in the genus Vespa. The nest is underground and on average contains around 50 hornets.

References

External links

Vespidae
Biological pest control wasps
Hymenoptera of Asia
Insects described in 1852